The Belz Great Synagogue (Belz Beis HaMedrash HaGadol) is one of the largest synagogues in Israel. It was built by the Belz Hasidic community with financial help from its supporters and admirers around the world.

Planning
In the 1980s, Rabbi Yissachar Dov Rokeach, the fifth Belzer Rebbe, spearheaded plans for the huge synagogue to be erected in the Kiryat Belz neighborhood of Jerusalem. The building, designed with four entrances accessible to each of the four streets of the hilltop neighborhood, would be an enlarged replica of the structure that the first Belzer Rebbe, the Sar Shalom, built in the town of Belz in 1843. It would include a grandiose main sanctuary, smaller study halls, wedding and bar mitzvah halls, libraries, and other communal facilities.

Construction
Funds for the ambitious, multimillion-dollar project were raised among Belzer Hasidim and were supplemented by various fundraising projects throughout the 1980s and 1990s.

Like the original synagogue, which took 15 years to complete, the new Belz synagogue that now dominates the northern Jerusalem skyline also took 15 years to construct. It was dedicated in 2000.

Its main sanctuary seats 2,584 worshippers. The ornate wooden ark, an item for the Guinness World Records, is 12 meters high and weighs 18 tons. It has the capacity to hold 70 Torah scrolls.

In stark contrast to the majestic synagogue, the simple wooden chair and shtender used by Rabbi Aharon Rokeach when he came to Palestine in 1944 stand in a glass case next to the ark.

Building layout

The main sanctuary is used only on Shabbat and Jewish holidays, while weekday services take place in the underlying smaller rooms of the complex. Under the main sanctuary are multiple floors. The floor directly under the main sanctuary hosts a large number of small synagogue rooms known as shtieblach, where services for Shacharit, Mincha and Maariv are held up to every 10 minutes. In an adjacent wing is also a large hall used for tishen. Below the shtieblach are multiple floors with dormitory-style sleeping quarters for Belzer Hasidim from outside of Israel, who come to be with the Rebbe for Jewish holidays such as Rosh HaShana, Yom Kippur and Sukkot. There are also large rooms for other functions, such as Seudah shlishit on Shabbat afternoons, weddings and bar mitzvah celebrations.

A separate two-story house for the Belzer Rebbe stands adjacent to the synagogue. Here the Rebbe maintains his office and receives guests, as well as resides with his family. The second-floor balcony of the house faces the large, outdoor courtyard of the synagogue, where Hasidim gather for outdoor addresses by the Rebbe and for large celebrations under a giant tent, such as the bar mitzvah banquets for the Rebbe's grandsons in 2008 and 2010.

Location
The Belz Great Synagogue is in Kiryat Belz neighborhood, 7 Binat Yisas'har St. 5, Jerusalem.

References

External links

World of Belz: See The Shul 
 
Belz (Hasidic dynasty)
Ashkenazi Jewish culture in Jerusalem
Hasidic synagogues
Synagogues in Jerusalem
Orthodox synagogues in Israel
Synagogues completed in 2000
2000 establishments in Israel